Expensive Shit is the twelfth full-length album by pioneering Afrobeat artist Fela Kuti and his Africa '70 band, released in 1975. It was reissued in 2000 by MCA Records, packaged with Kuti's He Miss Road (1975) on the same CD.

Background 
Throughout the early seventies, Fela Kuti lived in the Kalakuta Republic in Nigeria, a compound that also housed his family, his bandmates, and a recording studio. Due to Kuti's vocal anti-militaristic views, the police saw him and his compound as a political and social threat, often arresting Kuti and raiding the compound.

Music and lyrics 

The title of the album and first track refers to an incident in 1974. The Nigerian police planted a joint on Kuti. Before he was arrested, he ate the joint, but the police brought him into custody and waited for him to produce the (titular) excrement. According to legend, he managed to use another inmate's feces and was eventually released.

The second track is inspired by a Yoruban proverb about the power of nature and the universe.

Critical reception 

In its review of MCA Records' 2000 Expensive Shit/He Miss Road CD, Pitchfork wrote "it's all too easy to get caught up in Kuti's discography. Start with Expensive Shit and don't miss the road onward." Nick Reynolds from BBC Music called it a "classic Afrobeat reissue" and said the title song is "sarcastic, hilarious and righteously angry [while] 'Water No Get Enemy' is even better with a great latin tinged sax/chorus riff."

It was ranked number 78 on Pitchforks "Top 100 Albums of the 1970s" list.
In 2020, in their list of "The 500 Greatest Albums of All Time", Rolling Stone ranked Expensive Shit number 402.

Track listing

Personnel
Adapted from LP liner notes.
Fela Kuti – tenor saxophone, alto saxophone, piano, vocals, arrangement, composer, producerAfrica 70Tony Allen – lead drums
Henry Kofi – lead congas
Nicholas Addo – additional congas
Issac Olaleye – maracas
James Abayomi – sticks
Christopher Uwaifor – tenor saxophone
Lekan Animashaun – baritone saxophone
Tunde Williams – trumpet, solo
Ukem Stephen – 2nd trumpet
Ogene Kologbo – tenor guitar
Leke Benson – rhythm guitar
Franco Aboddy – bass guitarProduction'
Remi Olowookere – artwork, graphics
Peter Obe Photo Agency – photography
Demola Odebiyi – engineer
Roland Francis – executive producer

References

Further reading 
 

1975 albums
Fela Kuti albums
Afrobeat albums